Melchsee is a lake in the canton of Obwalden, Switzerland. It lends its name to the resort Melchsee-Frutt, in the municipality of Kerns.

See also
List of lakes of Switzerland
List of mountain lakes of Switzerland

External links

Lakes of the Swiss Alps
Lakes of Obwalden
Reservoirs in Switzerland
LMelchsee
Kerns, Switzerland